Tustan may refer to

Iran
Tustan, Baz Kia Gurab, a village of Baz Kia Gurab Rural District

Ukraine
Tustan, Ukraine, a village in Ivano-Frankivsk Oblast
Tustan, fortress ruins in Lviv Oblast, Ukraine